Eight Rings (foaled  March 24, 2017, in Kentucky) is an American Thoroughbred racehorse and the winner of the 2019 American Pharoah Stakes.

Career

Eight Rings' first race was on August 4, 2019, at Del Mar, where he came in first. 

On September 2, 2019, he competed in the Grade 1 2019 Del Mar Futurity, but did not finish after a collision with another horse, Storm the Court.

In his third race on September 27, 2019, he competed in the Grade 1 2019 American Pharoah Stakes. He won the race, defeating Storm the Court, who he collided with at the 2019 Del Mar Futurity. The win earned him a spot in the 2019 Breeders' Cup Juvenile and earned him consideration in the 2020 Road to the Kentucky Derby.

On November 1, 2019, Eight Rings competed in the 2019 Breeders' Cup Juvenile, finishing in 6th place behind his rival Storm the Court who won the race. On that result, trainer Bob Baffert said, "He didn't show up that day. I'm still upset at myself for not having him ready that day."

Eight Rings next start was in the 2020 Bachelor Stakes at Oaklawn Park, where he came fifth.

Pedigree

References

2017 racehorse births